This is the electoral history of Nita Lowey, who served as a U.S. Representative from New York from 1989 to 2021.

New York's 20th Congressional District

1988

1990

New York's 18th Congressional District

1992

1994

1996

1998

2000

2002

2004

2006

2008

2010

New York's 17th Congressional District

2012

2014

2016

2018

References

Lowey, Nita